Marco Tulio Ciani Barillas (born March 7, 1987, in Guatemala City, Guatemala) is a Guatemalan footballer currently playing for San Marcos de Arica.

Club career

San Marcos de Arica (2014–present)
Ciani was signed by SM Arica in June 2014. He made his debut on July 19 in the season opener against Colo Colo, coming off the bench for Kevin Harbottle.

Career statistics

References
 
 

1987 births
Living people
Guatemalan footballers
Guatemalan expatriate footballers
Universidad de San Carlos players
Comunicaciones F.C. players
Xelajú MC players
C.S.D. Municipal players
San Marcos de Arica footballers
Chilean Primera División players
Expatriate footballers in Chile
2011 Copa Centroamericana players
2013 Copa Centroamericana players
Association football midfielders
Guatemala international footballers